Johannes "Jan" Wilhelmus Peters (born 18 August 1954) is a Dutch former professional footballer and coach.

Club career
Nicknamed Jantje Breed, as he was renowned for his passes to the side, Peters started his career with VV Germania and then played for NEC. He made his debut for NEC on 14 November 1971 in a home game against FC Groningen. 

In 1974, 19-year-old Peters attracted the interest of Ajax, where Hans Kraay Sr. had just become manager, but the transfer eventually fell through. In July 1977, he signed with AZ '67, where Kraay Sr. had now become manager. At AZ, Peters played together with players such as Ronald Spelbos, Peter Arntz, Kristen Nygaard, Kurt Welzl, Kees Kist and Pier Tol, a team which in the 1980–81 season won the Eredivisie title, the KNVB Cup, and reached the final of the UEFA Cup. After five seasons, in which AZ was constantly in the top 4 clubs in the Eredivisie and won the national cup three times, Peters left for Serie A club Genoa in the summer of 1982. In Italy he also played for Atalanta, before returning to NEC, and to finish his career in amateur football with De Treffers.

International career
Peters obtained 31 caps for the Dutch national team, scoring four goals, in the 1970s and early 1980s. He is famous for scoring the goals that beat England 2–0 at Wembley in 1977.

Managerial career
After his retirement from professional football, Peters began coaching amateur club SJN in 1992. In 1995, he took over as manager of his former club De Treffers from his hometown of Groesbeek. He later also coached the second team of TOP Oss, a club where he was also the caretaker coach shortly in 1999.

Honours

Player
NEC
 Eerste Divisie: 1974–75

AZ '67
 Eredivisie: 1980–81
 KNVB Cup: 1977–78, 1980–81, 1981–82

De Treffers
 Netherlands Overall Amateur Championship: 1990–91
 Netherlands Sunday Amateur Championship: 1990–91
 Hoofdklasse Sunday B: 1989–90, 1990–91

Netherlands
 UEFA European Championship third-place: 1976

Manager
De Treffers
 Netherlands Overall Amateur Championship: 1997–98
 Netherlands Sunday Amateur Championship: 1997–98
 Hoofdklasse Sunday C: 1997–98, 2004–05

References

External links
  Profile

1954 births
Living people
People from Groesbeek
Footballers from Gelderland
Dutch footballers
Dutch expatriate footballers
Netherlands international footballers
UEFA Euro 1976 players
Association football midfielders
Eredivisie players
Eerste Divisie players
Serie A players
Serie B players
NEC Nijmegen players
AZ Alkmaar players
Atalanta B.C. players
Genoa C.F.C. players
De Treffers players
Expatriate footballers in Italy
Dutch expatriate sportspeople in Italy
Dutch football managers
De Treffers managers
TOP Oss managers